George Elsden (born c. 1530), of Lyme Regis, Dorset, was an English politician.

He was a Member (MP) of the Parliament of England for Reigate in 1558 and for Lyme Regis in 1572.

References

1530 births
Year of death missing
People from Lyme Regis
English MPs 1558
English MPs 1572–1583